INRA may refer to:
 Institut national de la recherche agronomique, the French agronomic research institution
 Instituto Nacional de Reforma Agraria, a Cuban agency formed to institute the Agrarian Reform Law of 1959
 International Nuclear Regulators' Association, an association of the most senior officials of the nuclear regulatory authorities
 Irish National Republican Army